Chhatra Yuva Sangharsh Samiti (CYSS), the student wing of the Aam Aadmi Party (AAP), was established on 9 April 2014.

Students' Union elections
In October 2022, CYSS won Panjab University Campus Students Council election, defeating Akhil Bharatiya Vidyarthi Parishad. In 2015, CYSS also contested Delhi University Student elections.

See also
 All India Students' Federation
 Students' Federation of India
 All India Students Association
 Akhil Bharatiya Vidyarthi Parishad
 Student Organisation of India
 National Students' Union of India

References

External links
 
 

2014 establishments in India
Student organisations in India
Student wings of political parties in India